Shabbos Negmatulloev (born 21 September 1997) is a Tajikistani boxer. He competed in the men's light heavyweight event at the 2020 Summer Olympics.

References

External links

1997 births
Living people
Tajikistani male boxers
Olympic boxers of Tajikistan
Boxers at the 2020 Summer Olympics
Sportspeople from Dushanbe